Kiefer is German for jaw(-bone) or pine tree.

It may also be a variation of the German word Küfer, meaning cooper.

Notable people with the surname include:

 Kiefer (musician) (born 1992), American pianist and producer
 Kiefer Sutherland (born 1966), Canadian television and film actor
 Adolph Kiefer (1918–2017), American Olympic swimmer
 Anselm Kiefer (born 1945), German painter and sculptor
 Bertrand Kiefer (born 1955), Swiss physician and ethicist
 David Kiefer (born 1984), American basketball coach
 Friedrich Kiefer (1897–1985), German copepodologist
 George W. Kiefer (1891-1943), American lawyer and politician
 Kiefer Ravena (born 1993), Filipino basketball player
 George Kiefer, American soccer coach at the University of South Florida
 Jack Kiefer (golfer) (1940–1999), American professional golfer
 Jack Kiefer (statistician) (1924–1981), American mathematical-statistician and Professor at Cornell University and University of California, Berkeley
 Jakob Kiefer (1919–1991), German Olympic gymnast
 Nat G. Kiefer (1939–1985), American politician who served in the Louisiana State Senate
 Nicholas M. Kiefer, statistician and economics professor at Cornell University
 Nicolas Kiefer (born 1977), German Olympic tennis player

See also
 Keifer (disambiguation)
 Kieffer
 Kefir

German-language surnames